Dissertation, Honey is the debut studio album by San Diego band The Plot to Blow Up the Eiffel Tower, released on the Happy Couples Never Last label on June 17, 2003. Note that the intro and outro songs, "Exhibitionism" and "Monotonous" are excerpts from one of poet Kailani Amerson's spoken verse sessions.

Track listing
All tracks by The Plot To Blow Up The Eiffel Tower

"Exhibitionism" – 1:02
"Sometimes I Wish I'd Lost a Leg" – 1:33
"One Stab Deserves Another" – 2:49
"Funeral Procession" – 1:28
"For Marcus" – 2:53
"Johnny, You're All Grown Up" – 2:12
"Her Health Violation" – 1:37
"Attached to the Hip" – 3:12
"Circuit" – 1:51
"It's in His Kiss" – 1:37
"Comeback 1968" – 1:19
"Safety is Of" – 2:33
"Monotonous" – 1:25

Personnel 

 Brandon Welchez - vocals, saxophone
 Dan Maier - bass
 Charles Rowell - guitar
 Brian Hill - drums

2003 debut albums
The Plot to Blow Up the Eiffel Tower albums